Empress Chung is a 2005 lost animated feature film, produced in North and South Korea and directed by Nelson Shin.

Synopsis
In this adventure, based on a famous Korean folk tale, a daughter sacrifices herself to restore her blind father's eyesight.

Production
As a personal project, Shin spent eight years getting the project off the ground, including three and a half years of pre-production. The film was co-produced in North Korea by the Chosun April 26th Children Film Studio (also known as SEK), and the score was also recorded in the North by the Pyongyang Film and Broadcasting Orchestra. In a move unusual for the Korean film industry, the character voices were recorded in both the South and the North due to differences in dialect. For the definitive international release version, the South Korean dub is the one used.

Release
On August 12, 2005, Empress Chung became the first film to have been released simultaneously in both North and South Korea. The film was featured at the 2004 Annecy International Animation Festival, and was also recognized with several awards in Korea.

The film grossed  on its opening weekend against a  budget, continuing a trend of under-performing animated features made for the Korean market.

Disappearance
Since the initial release, aside from few screenings across Europe, the film did not get an international theatrical release or home media release, and is considered lost. Nowadays, the only things related to the film that are online is the trailer, sound test animation, some screenshots and a collection of children's books.

There has also been evidence suggesting despite not being released on DVD internationally or in South Korea, that it was released in North Korea because Johannes Schönherr has mentioned Empress Chung when talking about his latest North Korean DVD acquiring, however without more evidence it can neither be confirmed or disconfirmed whether North Korean DVD release is real.

See also

 Cinema of Korea
 Korean animation
 List of animated feature films of the 2000s

References

External links
 
 
 Empress Chung at the Korean Movie Database
 Empress Chung at HanCinema
 ’Simpsons’ animator knocks on doors of N.K. with Korean folk tale

South Korean animated films
Lost animated films
2005 films
2005 animated films
2000s children's animated films
Lost Korean films
Epic fantasy films
2000s fantasy adventure films
Films based on Korean myths and legends
Films directed by Nelson Shin
Films set in Korea
Korea in fiction
North Korean epic films
South Korean epic films
South Korean independent films
2000s lost films
2000s South Korean films
North Korean animated films